Skysoft was a Portuguese systems and software house in the areas of aeronautics, security, space and telematics. The company was acquired by GMV Innovating Solutions in 2005.

External links 
GMV

Software companies of Portugal
Software companies established in 1990
Portuguese companies established in 1990
Companies based in Lisbon
Software companies disestablished in 2005
2005 disestablishments in Portugal
2005 mergers and acquisitions